WLEB-LP (93.1 FM) is a low-power FM radio station licensed to serve Lebanon, Pennsylvania. The station is currently owned by Calvary Chapel Lebanon.

History
The Federal Communications Commission issued a construction permit for the station to Latino American Media Organization of Pennsylvania, Inc. (LAMO) on July 1, 2003. The station was assigned the call sign WOMA-LP on July 30, 2003, and received its license to cover on February 3, 2004. On May 1, 2009, LAMO assigned the station's license to the current owner, Calvary Chapel Lebanon, at a purchase price of $18,000. On August 6, 2009, the station changed its call sign to the current WLEB-LP.

Translators
The following three translators are licensed to simulcast the programming of WLEB-LP:

References

External links
 
 
 
 

LEB-LP
Radio stations established in 2004
2004 establishments in Pennsylvania
LEB-LP